Phoebe Stänz (born 7 January 1994) is a Swiss ice hockey forward and member of the Swiss national ice hockey team, currently playing with Leksands IF Dam of the Swedish Women's Hockey League (SDHL). She played college ice hockey with the Yale Bulldogs and her senior career has been played in the SDHL and Swiss Women's League (previously SWHL A and LKA).

Playing career
Stänz attended Choate Rosemary Hall Preparatory School in Wallingford, Connecticut during the 2012–13 school year. She was named MVP of the Prep School league and was honored as a 2013 Boston Globe All-Scholastic pick. While attending Choate, she also played club hockey with Assabet Valley, winning the 2013 National Championship with them.

Yale Bulldogs
played for the Yale Bulldogs women's ice hockey team.  In four years of NCAA play, she won numerous awards, including USCO Rookie of the Year in 2014, and a selection to the All-ECAC Third Team.

While studying at Yale University, she majored in mathematics and economics. She worked in marketing for the Swiss Ice Hockey Federation during the summer months. She is also an accomplished musician.

International play

U18 World Competition
Stänz played for the Swiss National U18 team for the IIHF World Championships in 2011 (Sweden), 2012 (Czech Republic) and the 2013 Qualifying Tournament in Switzerland.

2014 Olympics (Sochi, Russia)
Phoebe Stänz was chosen to play with the Swiss National Team at the Winter Olympics in 2014.  During the Bronze medal game, she scored the game-tying goal against Sweden, allowing Switzerland a 4–3 victory, and the medal.

IIHF Teams
Stänz continues to play for the Swiss team.  She was a member of the 2016  IIHF Olympic qualifying tournament.  Switzerland won a spot in the 2018 Olympics in Korea. The Swiss National Team is currently ranked 6th worldwide.
She is a longtime teammate of Lara Stalder, who plays NCAA Hockey for the Minnesota-Duluth Bulldogs.

NCAA

References

External links

1994 births
Living people
People from Kulm District
Swiss women's ice hockey forwards
Ice hockey players at the 2014 Winter Olympics
Ice hockey players at the 2018 Winter Olympics
Ice hockey players at the 2022 Winter Olympics
Medalists at the 2014 Winter Olympics
Olympic bronze medalists for Switzerland
Olympic ice hockey players of Switzerland
Olympic medalists in ice hockey
Leksands IF Dam players
Luleå HF/MSSK players
SDE Hockey players
Yale Bulldogs women's ice hockey players
Choate Rosemary Hall alumni
Swiss expatriate ice hockey people
Swiss expatriate sportspeople in the United States
Swiss expatriate sportspeople in Sweden
Sportspeople from Aargau